Sarjano Khalid is an Indian actor who mostly appears in Malayalam and Tamil films. He is known for June (2019), Adhyarathri  (2019), Big Brother (2020), Enniver (2020) and Cobra (2022).

Career 
Khalid made his film entry through Nonsense (2018). He joined the sets to learn about the aspects of film making and only appeared in a couple of scenes. His next film was Adhyarathri playing opposite Anaswara Rajan. Khalid's first lead role was in the film June with Rajisha Vijayan and several newcomers. In December 2019, he played a role in the Gautam Menon web series Queen, which marked his television debut. In 2020, he played Mohanlal's younger brother in the film Big Brother. His next film was R. Ajay Gnanamuthu's Cobra. The film is marked as his Tamil debut.

Filmography 

All films are in Malayalam language unless otherwise noted.

Awards

References

External links 
 

Living people
Male actors in Malayalam cinema
Male actors in Tamil cinema
Indian male film actors
21st-century Indian male actors
Year of birth missing (living people)
Place of birth missing (living people)